Joseph Bryant "Joe" Raynor Jr. (January 26, 1923 – September 4, 2014) was a politician in the American state of North Carolina.

He was born in Cumberland County, North Carolina in 1923. After graduating high school, he opened up an automotive supply business. He was elected to the North Carolina House of Representatives in the 1960s and served eight consecutive terms.

He was elected to the North Carolina State Senate in to represent the tenth district. He retired in 1992.

He wed Mildred Horne in 1944 and lived in Fayetteville, North Carolina until his death in 2014.

References

1923 births
2014 deaths
People from Cumberland County, North Carolina
Businesspeople from North Carolina
Democratic Party members of the North Carolina House of Representatives
Democratic Party North Carolina state senators
20th-century American businesspeople